Methadone maintenance treatment is the use of the medicine methadone, administered on an ongoing basis, as treatment for dependence on heroin or other opioids. Methadone is an opioid agonist, binding to the same receptors in the brain as heroin or other opioids. It works by relieving withdrawal symptoms and may cause respiratory depression and/or euphoria in some patients at higher doses. Known to be one of the best researched of the medically assisted approaches to addiction treatment. Methadone maintenance reduces the cravings for or use of other opioids, and reduces risk of fatal overdose from street drugs. Involving a daily dose of prescribed medicine, methadone maintenance has been termed "a first step toward social rehabilitation" because it increases retention of patients in treatment, relieves them from the need to find, buy and use multiple daily doses of street opioids, and offers a legal medical alternative.

Modality 
Introduced as an analgesic in the US in 1947, methadone has been used in maintenance treatment—also known as substitution treatment, or drug replacement therapy—since 1964. Therapeutic dosing is contingent upon individual patient needs, with dosage range generally between 20 and 200 mg. Doses are unsafe for opioid-naive individuals, and administration of methadone is gradually titrated upwards to reach therapeutic dose under medical supervision to reduce risk of overdose. The amount of oral methadone that a patient will require is dependent on the amount and power of opioids they consumed prior to treatment initiation, with an assessment in the mid-2000s (prior to widespread introduction of fentanyl into street heroin supplies in the US) finding that 1 gram of street Heroin is roughly equivalent to 50 to 80 mg of methadone. Methadone is taken either orally as DTF (Drug Tariff Formula) methadone mixture 1 mg/1ml which is supplied as a red or clear liquid, but can now also be prescribed as a mixture containing 10 mg of methadone in 1ml of liquid (green color) or methadone 20 mg in 1ml (brown color). This is often used when a person is on a large amount of methadone and is rarely permitted for consumption unsupervised, because these formulations are not as viscous as the 1 mg/1ml mixture, they are more prone to mis-use as they are easier to inject, and also due to the high risk of overdose if diverted to individual unused to such a large dose. Methadone also comes in 40 mg dispersible tablets called "diskettes", as well as 5 and 10 mg pills, round or "coffin" shaped. The pills are only given in hospital settings. Methadone can also be delivered by either IV or IM injection, and ampoules come in various strengths from 10 mg up to 50 mg, this method is often used for individuals who have a "needle fixation" and who would otherwise revert to using iv heroin. .

With the emergence of other l medications for treatment of opioid addiction such as buprenorphine ( an opioid agonist/antagonist approved by the Food and Drug Administration (FDA) for substance use disorder treatment in October 2000), and long-acting naltrexone (an opioid antagonist, approved for addiction treatment in 2010), methadone maintenance treatment is no longer the dominant medically assisted addiction treatment. The manufacturers of long-acting, injectable naltrexone have marketed this medicine as superior because it is not an opioid, an argument that has moved criminal justice officials to prefer the medicine and triggered a Congressional investigation about mismarketing. No study has found naltrexone superior to methadone or buprenorphine, and real world review of patient records suggest that methadone and buprenorphine are superior at reducing overdose risk or need for acute drug dependence treatment.

Dispensing
Methadone maintenance generally requires patients to visit the dispensing or dosing clinic daily, in accordance with state controlled substance laws. Methadone, when administered at constant daily milligram doses, will stabilize patients so that they do feel a "high" from methadone and will not require additional street opioids. Most clinics will work with you to get to a dosing level that will take away all cravings for other opiates without feeling to much of a "high" so they can function correctly throughout their day.

In the U.S., patients attending methadone clinics regularly and abstaining from use of street opioids or other controlled substances such as benzodiazepenes or cannabis can be permitted take home doses also known in some clinics as privileges, though this is at the discretion of the clinic's medical staff. Depending on the states law some clinics will allow for use of drugs like cannabis, and still be permitted take home doses (privileges). Some states allow methadone clinics to close on Sundays and provide take-home medication the day before. Clinics that over take home privileges will usually do so by slowly offering more take home days over a period of time, as long as their standards of clean drug tests are met. In some states these take home privileges can work their way to people getting take home doses that would last them 2–4 weeks maximum. Another way take homes are permitted is if the clinic puts you on a split dose schedule where you take part of your dose in the morning and take home a dose to take later in the day. This is usually given out to people on higher doses or to help lengthen effectiveness throughout the day. States may require or mandate drug testing in clinic drug abuse groups and/or outside Narcotics Anonymous meetings.In some other countries, dispensing of methadone maintenance by pharmacies, or via prescription from general practitioners rather than specialized clinics, is permitted.

Travel
In the UK, patients on methadone maintenance who wish to travel overseas are subject to certain legal requirements surrounding the exportation of and importation of methadone. The prescriber must be provided with details of travel, after which the prescriber will arrange for a Home Office Export Licence to be provided. This licence is only required if the total amount being exported exceeds 500 mg. The granting of the licence does not allow for the importation of the methadone into any overseas jurisdiction. For importation, the patient should contact the Embassy of the country of destination and request permission to import methadone onto their shores, although not all countries allow the importation of controlled drugs. The licence also allows for the re-importation of any remaining methadone back into the UK. It is normal for patients travelling overseas to be prescribed methadone in a tablet form, as tablets are easier to transport. For patients who expect to be overseas for a prolonged period of time, "courtesy" arrangements should be made at a local clinic which will arrange for the prescription of the necessary medication. If traveling throughout the United States either to a different state or city clinics may offer "take home" doses for the period of time you will be gone. Depending on travel length or clinic rules they may opt to have you "Courtesy" dose at another clinic that would be closer to where you travel.

Controversy
Methadone maintenance is otherwise known as drug replacement therapy or ORT (opiate replacement therapy), and has been the subject of much controversy since its inception. Opponents note that methadone prescription replaces dependence on one opioid with another, that methadone maintenance does not prevent additional use of heroin or other opioids in addition to methadone, and that the stabilization or "blocking" effect on euphoria can be overridden with use of other opioids or with benzodiazepenes.

In England and Wales, criminal justice drugs workers employed by the 'Drug Interventions Programme' are based in most arrest suites nationwide. Heroin and crack cocaine users are identified either by mandatory urine tests (in areas known as DIP 'intensive'), or by cell-sweeps and face-to-face discussions with arrestees (in areas known as DIP 'non-intensive' sites). Identified drug use will often trigger a referral to local drug services, whose first line response to heroin dependence is likely to involve substitute (buprenorphine or methadone) prescribing.

This line of work originated in the mid- to late-1990s, as large-scale studies identified significant levels of heroin and crack cocaine use in populations of arrestees (particularly for theft offences). In a large-scale study of drug misuse in arrested populations, Holloway and Bennett identified 466 'drug misusing repeat offenders'. Of these, 80% declared an 'unmet need for treatment' (2004:33)

Contemporaneously, the National Treatment Outcomes Research Study (NTORS) found high levels of acquisitive (money-related) offending in populations of people seeking community treatment for drug problems. In one early NTORS report, Godfrey et al. identified that every £1 spent on drug treatment could yield between £9.50 and £18 of savings in social costs, mostly attributable to reductions in treatment seekers' levels of offending.

These studies, along with others, were taken on by Tony Blair whilst still Shadow Home Secretary, as Conservative policy regarding drug misuse was relatively undeveloped. Blair disseminated a press release in 1994 entitled Drugs: the Need for Action, claiming that drug misuse caused £20bn of acquisitive crime each year; a report dismissed by the Conservative Secretary of State for the Home Department as 'four pages of hot waffle against the Government, with three miserable paragraphs at the end' (Hansard, 10 March 1994, column 393).

After winning the UK general election of 1997, Blair's first cross-governmental drug strategy established the nationwide development of an integrated drugs / crime strategy a priority. Drugs workers were in police custody suites nationwide, and seeing 50,000 people each year, in 2001. The work of these teams was then formalised in 2003, given an expanded remit (working with prisoners following release, for example) and rebadged the Drug Interventions Programme.

The founding strapline for DIP was, significantly, 'out of crime, into treatment' – reflecting the crime-reduction philosophy behind criminal justice drug treatment and ongoing methadone (or buprenorphine) maintenance at that time. In their 2010 Drug Strategy, the Conservative / Liberal Democrat coalition state their continued intention to support DIP.

See also
Opioid use disorder
Stimulant maintenance

References

External links
 U.S. National Library of Medicine - Methadone Definition
 Directory of U.S. Methadone Maintenance Facilities

Drug rehabilitation